The Avia 57 was a 1930s Czechoslovak 14-passenger commercial transport, designed by Robert Nebesář and built by Avia. The type was not a success.

Development
The Avia 57 was a three-engined low-wing monoplane that first flew in 1935. Powered by three Hispano-Suiza 9Vd radial engines, it had landing gear that retracted into the nacelles of the wing-mounted engines.

Specifications

References

Notes

Bibliography

1930s Czechoslovakian airliners
Trimotors
57
Low-wing aircraft
Aircraft first flown in 1935